47th New York Film Critics Circle Awards
January 31, 1982

Best Picture: 
 Reds 
The 47th New York Film Critics Circle Awards honored the best filmmaking of 1981. The winners were announced on 21 December 1981 and the awards were given on 31 January 1982.

Winners
Best Actor:
Burt Lancaster - Atlantic City
Runners-up: Henry Fonda - On Golden Pond and Robert Duvall - True Confessions
Best Actress:
Glenda Jackson - Stevie
Runners-up: Faye Dunaway - Mommie Dearest and Diane Keaton - Reds
Best Cinematography:
David Watkin - Chariots of Fire
Best Director:
Sidney Lumet - Prince of the City
Runners-up: Louis Malle - Atlantic City, Hugh Hudson - Chariots of Fire and Warren Beatty - Reds
Best Film:
Reds
Runners-up: Prince of the City, Atlantic City and Chariots of Fire
Best Foreign Language Film:
Pixote (Pixote: a Lei do Mais Fraco) • Brazil 
Runners-up: Man of Iron (Człowiek z żelaza) • Poland, Man of Marble (Człowiek z marmuru) • Poland and The Last Metro (Le dernier métro) • France
Best Screenplay:
John Guare - Atlantic City
Runners-up: Sidney Lumet and Jay Presson Allen - Prince of the City, Dennis Potter - Pennies from Heaven and Steve Gordon - Arthur
Best Supporting Actor:
John Gielgud - Arthur
Runners-up: Jack Nicholson - Reds, Jerry Orbach - Prince of the City and Howard E. Rollins Jr. - Ragtime
Best Supporting Actress:
Mona Washbourne - Stevie
Runners-up: Marília Pêra - Pixote (Pixote: a Lei do Mais Fraco) and Maureen Stapleton - Reds
Special Awards:
Andrzej Wajda
Krzysztof Zanussi
Abel Gance's Napoléon

References

External links
1981 Awards

1981
New York Film Critics Circle Awards, 1981
New York Film Critics Circle Awards
New York Film Critics Circle Awards
New York Film Critics Circle Awards
New York Film Critics Circle Awards